Osiglia (Ligurian and ) is a comune (municipality) in the Province of Savona in the Italian region Liguria, located about  west of Genoa and about  west of Savona.

Osiglia borders the following municipalities: Bormida, Calizzano, Millesimo, Murialdo, Pallare, and Rialto.

Related articles 
 Monte Camulera

References

Cities and towns in Liguria